Shi Tiesheng (January 4, 1951 – December 31, 2010) was a Chinese novelist, known for his story which was the basis of the film Life on a String. The China Daily stated regarding his essay about the park near where he lived, "Many critics have considered I and the Temple of Earth (:zh:我与地坛) as one of the best Chinese prose essays of the 20th century."

Shi was born in Beijing, and graduated from Tsinghua University High School.
In 1969 he was a "sent-down youth" or urban youth sent to a rural area of Shaanxi as part of the Down to the Countryside Movement of the Cultural Revolution. There he was paralyzed in an accident at the age of 21, and was sent back to Beijing.

Shi was published for the first time in 1979. His 1983 short story "My Faraway Clear Peace River" (我的遥远的清平湾) won the National Excellent Short Story Prize. The story is about a sent-down youth and an old man of the village, and takes the view that the peasants suffer more over the long term than the urban youth sent from the city.  A sequel, "A Story of Rustication" ("Chadui de gushi") was published in 1986.

In 1980 director Tian Zhuangzhuang based a short film called Our Corner on a story by Shi; it was the first film by a filmmaker of China's Fifth Generation Cinema.

Shi's 1985 novella "Like a Banjo String" (命若琴弦) about a pair of blind musicians, was the basis of the 1991 film Life on a String directed by Chen Kaige.

His collections of short stories include My Faraway Clear Peace River (Wo de yaoyuan de qingping wan) (1985) and Sunday (Libairi) (1988).

A collection of English-language translations of his short stories was published in 1991 as Strings of Life.

In 1996, his novel Notes on Principles (务虚笔记) was published.
In selecting it as a notable work of Chinese literature since 1949 which could qualify as an overlooked classic, Professor Shelley W. Chan of Wittenberg University said Notes on Principles was similar to but better than Soul Mountain by Nobel Prize-winner Gao Xingjian.

In 1998, his kidneys began to fail and he subsequently required dialysis three times
weekly.

He received the Lao She Literature Prize for Fragments Written at the Hiatuses of Sickness (病隙碎笔)(2002).

In 2006, he published My Sojourn in Ding Yi (我的丁一之旅), about an immortal spirit that inhabits the bodies of a succession of people, including Adam, Shi Tiesheng himself, and the book's hero, Ding Yi. An English translation of this novel was published by Sinoist Books in 2019.

On the morning of December 31, 2010, Shi died of cerebral hemorrhage.

References

External links
Shi Tiesheng books in WorldCat
English translation of The Temple of Earth and I in Turnrow, the Bi-annual Journal of the University of Louisiana at Monroe
Shi Tiesheng at Paper Republic

1951 births
2010 deaths
Chinese people with disabilities
Short story writers from Beijing
Chinese male short story writers
20th-century novelists
20th-century Chinese short story writers
20th-century Chinese male writers
People's Republic of China short story writers
People's Republic of China novelists